The R473 road is a regional road in Ireland, located in the southern coastal parts of County Clare.

References

Regional roads in the Republic of Ireland
Roads in County Clare